Cydia cosmophorana is a moth of the  family Tortricidae. It is found from northern and central Europe to eastern Russia.

The wingspan is 9–13 mm. Adults are on wing in May and June. At times there is a small second generation in August. They frequent pine forests and plantations and are most active in hot sunshine at midday and in the afternoon.

The larvae primarily feed on Pinus sylvestris, but have also been recorded on Pinus strobus, Picea excelsa and Juniperus communis. The larvae live in resinous nodules and excrescences on the bark of the trunk and branches of the host plant, and also in galls and mines of other Tortricidae and Pyralidae species.

External links
Eurasian Tortricidae

Grapholitini
Moths described in 1835
Moths of Europe